Aathmasanthi is a 1952 Indian Malayalam-language film, directed by Joseph Thaliyath. The film stars T. K. Madhavan Nair and Miss Kumari.

The film was dubbed into Tamil with the same title and released in the same year. Tamil dialogues and songs were written by Nanchilnadu T. N. Rajappa. Two songs, "Vandi Rendum Oduthu Paar" and "Kadhal Vaazhvil Thaaney" were written by K. P. Kamatchi.

Cast
 T. K. Madhavan Nair
 Miss Kumari
 Neyyaattinkara Komalam
 S. P. Pillai
 Aranmula Ponnamma

Cast as per Tamil version

 Vanchiyoor as Santhanam
 Kottarakara as Sekar
 K. Ramasamy as Raghu
 S. P. Pillai as Sankaran
 P. M. Devan as Damodhara Mudaliar
 P. B. Vairam as Shet
 Miss Kumari as Nirmala
 Komalam as Saratha
 Vani as Vimala
 Ponnamma as Mangalam
 Lakshmi as Parvathi
 Menaka as Komalam
 Prabulla as Bala Nirmala

Soundtrack
Music was composed by T. R. Pappa.
Malayalam
Lyrics were penned by Abhayadev.

Tamil
Lyrics were penned by T. N. Rajappa and K. P. Kamatchisundaram.

References

External links
 

1950s Malayalam-language films
Films scored by T. R. Pappa